Ramudu (Telugu: రాముడు) in Telugu language means Hindu Lord Rama.

 Andala Ramudu, is a 2006 Telugu film. 
 Adavi Ramudu (1977 film) is a 1977 Telugu film. 
 Adavi Ramudu (2004 film) is a 2004 Telugu film.
 Allari Ramudu is a 2002 Telugu film. 
 Donga Ramudu (1955 film) is a 1955 Telugu film.
 Kaliyuga Ramudu is a 1982 Telugu film. 
 Ramudu Bheemudu is a 1964 Telugu film.